The Seafarer 23 Kestrel is a Dutch trailerable sailboat that was designed by Sparkman & Stephens in daysailer and cruiser models, first built in 1963.

The Seafarer 23 Kestrel is often confused with the 1978 Seafarer 23 Challenger and the 1976 Seafarer 23.

Production
The design was built by De Vries Lentsch in Amsterdam, starting in 1963 and imported into the United States by Seafarer Fiberglass Yachts of New York City. Seafarer later produced the boat in its own plant, a converted supermarket in Huntington, New York, but it is now out of production.

Design
The Seafarer 23 Kestrel is a recreational keelboat, built predominantly of fiberglass, with wood trim. It has a masthead sloop rig; a spooned, raked stem; a raised counter, angled transom; a keel-mounted rudder controlled by a tiller and a fixed, stub, long keel, with a retractable centerboard. It displaces  and carries  of iron ballast.

The boat is normally fitted with a small  well-mounted outboard motor for docking and maneuvering. The transom lazarette well is large enough to allow the motor to be tilted to reduce drag while sailing.

The Kestrel was offered in a number of different deck and interior layouts. Initially there were two deck patterns for a daysailer and a cruiser, but later an intermediate deck was added. There were also six interior plans, including a bare one for owner completion. Model marketing names similarly varied, including Seafarer 23 Kestrel, Seafarer Kestrel 23, Kestrel 23 and Kestrel 22. Model configuration names included Cruiser, Overnighter, Catalina, Nassau, Nantucket, Monhegan and Olympic. In 1969 all the models were sold as the Seafarer Sail 'n Trailer 23. 

The cruiser cabin design typically has sleeping accommodation for four people, with a double "V"-berth in the bow cabin and two straight settee berths in the main cabin. The galley is on both sides, aft of the bow cabin and is equipped with stove to port and a sink to starboard. The head is located centered in the bow cabin under the "V"-berth.

Operational history
In a 2010 review Steve Henkel wrote, "the grace of the classic Sparkman & Stephens hull form will appeal to traditional sailors."

See also
List of sailing boat types

References

External links

Photo of a Seafarer 23 Kestrel Cruise

    

Keelboats
1960s sailboat type designs
Sailing yachts 
Trailer sailers
Sailboat type designs by Sparkman and Stephens
Sailboat types built by De Vries Lentsch
Sailboat types built by Seafarer Yachts